A material passport is a digital document listing all the materials that are included in a product or construction during its life cycle in order to facilitate strategizing circularity decisions in supply chain management. Passports generally consists of a set of data describing defined characteristics of materials in products, which enables the identification of value for recovery, recycling and re-use. These passports have been adopted as a best practice for business process analysis and improvement in the widely applied supply chain operation reference (SCOR) by the association for supply chain management.

The core idea behind the concept is that a material passport will contribute to a more circular economy, in which materials are being recovered, recycled and/or re-used in an open-traded material market. The concept of the 'material passport’ is currently being developed by multiple parties in mainly European countries. A possible second-hand material market or material bank could become a reality in the future.

Similar type of passports for the circular economy are being developed by several parties under a variety of terminology. Other names for the material passport are:
 Circularity passport 
 Cradle-to-cradle passport 
 Product passport 
Closely related concepts, which share some of the life cycle registrations that passports also support, are the bill of materials, product life cycle management, digital twin, and ecolabels. The key difference to these concepts is that a passport provides an identity of a single identifiable object while it acts as a certified interface to all life-cycle registrations a product is concerned with.

Significance 
"According to United Nations estimates, construction accounts for some 50 percent of raw material consumption in Europe and 60 percent of waste."

Assuming that the earth is a closed system, this situation is objectively untenable. There is an urgent need to go about raw materials in a more intelligent way. A shift in the building sector would greatly benefit a situation towards needing less material, and using material more effectively, e.g. by ensuring a much longer and more useful life cycle.
Proponents of the material passport argue that it is a step towards this direction.

The material passport gives material an identity. By acknowledging that it exists, in a given form in a specific building, it ensures that material receives and keeps a value, e.g. through a possible re-use after the deconstruction of for example a building.

Like a personal passport, the material passport allows the material to ‘travel,' or identifies the most useful future destination after it has served in a building. This could be in another building or in another product altogether.

By recognizing the individual materials in buildings, new ownership structures could be facilitated that would enable more functions to be offered as a service. As lighting can be provided as a service, functions such as "shelter from elements" could be a service instead of owning a roof.

In general, material passports create incentives for suppliers to produce and developers / managers / renovators to choose healthy, sustainable and circular materials/building products. They fit into a broader and growing movement that aims at developing circular building business models.

Applicability 
The material passport can be applied to every product or construction. There are different levels in which a product/construct can be discomposed:
Product level
Component level
Material level

For a building, a material passport could be a complete description of all products (staircase, window, furnace, ...), components (iron beam, glass panel, ...), and raw materials (wood, steel, ...),that are present in the building. Ideally, this database is created during construction and subsequently continuously kept up to date. In case an existing building does not yet have a material passport, it can be created through various methods (e.g. plan analysis, digital 3D scanning).

A material passport allows the owner of a product/construct to know exactly what it is made of. This is of importance at the end of its useful life, to enable the most effective re-use of the materials. It allows the owner to view a product/construct as a depot, inventory of valuable materials.

Furthermore, the process of creating a material passport also shapes the design of the building. The easier the materials can be extracted and re-used, the better. This will lead to an increase of ‘recoverable’ or ‘reversible’ buildings, buildings that can be dis-assembled as easily as they were assembled.

Another possibility is that a material passport enables the owner to get a better overview of value of the product/construct. Besides the value of the location and of the space, it can now also improve the valuation of the materials used. A higher, or more accurate, valuation of product/construct can be made possible.

Advantages and disadvantages

Advantages
 By having a material passport, one can anticipate on the deconstruction of the properties and ensure the highest possible usefulness of the materials used after having vacated premises. This is another way of being conscious about the footprint, and limiting our negative impact on the environment.
 A more granular understanding of the construction of a building, might enable novel forms of financing that will support suppliers to provide a service rather than sell a product.
 By reviewing how buildings are valued now, new financing products or financing policies (e.g. higher collateral value) can be developed that better reflect the (financial) value of buildings.
 The recovery of a collateral in case of default might improve through the sale of the parts instead of the building as a whole.

Disadvantages
 A passport needs to be kept up to date and maintained throughout a building's life. It is not known yet how work intensive this is, but for it to remain relevant, all changes to the building that happened after the passport was created, need to be logged. Potentially the value of this work will only be apparent at the end of the useful life of a building, which might be several decades away.
 The market for second hand materials is still in its infancy, and currently not able to support the optimal re-use of the materials in a building. Also, much more standardization, at least at the level of components, will be needed to increase the re-use the materials in a building.
 There is no standardization for material passports yet. Passports might therefore prove to have limited usefulness when ultimately needed, due to evolving requirements, or require additional investments during the life of the building to keep them up to market standard.
Legislation needs to be put in place, to support more sustainable building, enable the development of services instead of ownership, ... and support a broad deployment of material passports.
 The infrastructure, mainly IT, to support material passports still needs to be created.
The first scientific publication about a material passport (2012) was written by Maayke Damen and is called "A resources passport for a circular economy".  It provides a comprehensive overview of the advantages and disadvantages of a material passport for every actor in the supply chain. It includes an outline for the content of a material passport.

Projects

NL
 Turntoo: consultancy firm established by Thomas Rau, that offers services and concepts optimising the continuity of life on earth. The development of material passports as a product is one of them. Thomas Rau's system is called MADASTER.
 COFA Nederland: Initiative of FBBasic and A. van Liempd demolition contractors to develop a more circular way of demolition and re-use of materials.
 Concept House Village (RDM)

EU
 BAMB 2020: Buildings as Material Banks, an EU funded project bringing together 16 European parties (universities, building, it companies, consultants, policy makers). Partners: Brussels Environment, EPEA Nederland, Vrije UNiversiteit Brussel, BRE, ZUYD Hogeschool, IBM, SundaHus, Ronneby Kommun, Technical University of Munich, Universiteit Twente, Universidade do Minho, Sarajevo Green Design Foundation, Drees & Sommer, VITO, BAM Construct UK, Aurubis.
 EPEA (also partner of BAMB): An internationally active scientific research and consultancy institute that works with actors and companies from economy, politics and science and support them for the introduction of circular processes, using the cradle-to-cradle design approach.
 Maersk Line (sea-vessels): The world's largest container shipping company. They focus on vessel recycling and re-use.
 ActNow: A business-driven non-profit partnership consisting of businesses, NGOs and municipalities. Act NOW's agenda focuses on enhancing the implementation of existing energy-efficient solutions and products NOW.

See also 
 Digital Product Passport

External links 
 BAMB2020 Material passports

References 

Construction
Material handling